The Irish League in season 1975–76 comprised 12 teams, and the Crusaders won the championship.

League standings

Results

References
Northern Ireland - List of final tables (RSSSF)

NIFL Premiership seasons
1975–76 in Northern Ireland association football
North